The Boss of the Rancho is a 1919 American silent Western film starring Texas Guinan.

This Guinan short survives at George Eastman House.

Cast
 Texas Guinan

References

External links
 

1919 films
1919 Western (genre) films
1919 short films
American silent short films
American black-and-white films
Silent American Western (genre) films
1910s American films
1910s English-language films